The Ordu Boztepe Gondola is an aerial lift line in Ordu serving the nearby  hilltop Boztepe. It is owned and operated by Ordu Municipality.

and the line officially opened on June 9, 2012. The base station is situated in the downtown at Black Sea coast. There is a parking lot for 180 cars next to the base station. There are seven supporting towers between the terminals. 28 cabins each capable of eight passengers  are able to transport hourly 900 people in one direction. The ride takes 6.5 minutes.

Boztepe is a tourist attraction with a panoramic view over the city and the Black Sea coast featuring restaurants. The return ticket for the ride cost 25.00 for turkish citizens and 100.00 for citizens of other nations.

Specifications
 Line length: 
 Height difference: 
 Number of stations: 2
 Number of cabins: 28 each eight-seater
 Trip duration: 6.5 minutes
 Hourly ridership: 1,800
 Fare: 5.00 
 Terminals:
 Ordu 
 Boztepe

See also
 List of gondola lifts in Turkey

References

Gondola lifts in Turkey
2012 establishments in Turkey
Transport infrastructure completed in 2012
Ordu